"Opportunities (Let's Make Lots of Money)" is a song by English synth-pop duo Pet Shop Boys from their debut studio album, Please (1986). It was released as a single in 1985 and re-recorded and reissued in 1986, gaining greater popularity in both the United Kingdom and United States with its second release, reaching number 11 on the UK Singles Chart and number 10 on the US Billboard Hot 100. After a Super Bowl ad in February 2021, featuring the song, it re-entered the charts claiming the Billboard Dance/Electronic Digital Songs No. 1 spot on 27 February, 2021, among others.

Background
The song was written during the Pet Shop Boys' formative years, in 1983. According to Neil Tennant, the main lyrical concept came while in a recording studio in Camden Town when Chris Lowe asked him to make up a lyric based around the line "Let's make lots of money".

The first version of the song, recorded with the duo's first producer, Bobby Orlando, was not released; upon signing with record label Parlophone, they re-recorded the song with J. J. Jeczalik (of Art of Noise) and Nicholas Froome.

The original single release charted at number 116 in the UK, to be exceedingly outdone by the number-one spectacle of the second release of "West End Girls" in multiple countries. With producer Stephen Hague still on board from that release, a new single version for the duo's debut album, Please, was mixed with reprogramming done by Hague and re-recorded vocals from Tennant. The second release of "Opportunities", following the album's release, resulted in better chart performance. It is the only single from the band to chart higher in the US than the UK, becoming the duo's second top-10 single in the US, peaking at number 10, and just missing out (number 11) in the UK. In Australia, the first version was the one to chart (although outside the top 40).

Please also included a brief, cacophonic track titled "Opportunities (Reprise)", which was the original middle section to the song proper before it was edited out.

Composition
The lyrics depict, in Tennant's words, "two losers". The song is written from the perspective of a man who describes himself as being intellectual and educated. The lyrics are addressed towards another character, identified as having "looks" and "brawn", and who is invited to join the song's protagonist in a scheme to "make lots of money".

Tennant has made it clear that the schemes are doomed to failure. The protagonist's claimed accreditations, a PhD in mathematics from the Sorbonne and knowledge of computer programming, are conceited fabrications. The punchline of the song, he says, is that "the people in it are not going to make any money".

The lyrics' meaning is taken at face value by some listeners, and this subsequent interpretation of the song as a materialistic anthem receives mixed reactions. The satirical interpretation, on the other hand, has cemented the Pet Shop Boys' reputation as ironists for many, to the band's chagrin since often their more-sincere songs are ignored as a result.

A notable change between the original and re-recorded versions of "Opportunities" is the omission of the spoken outro "All the love that we had / And the love that we hide / Who will bury us / When we die?" According to Tennant, the lyrics were removed from the second version of the song as the duo feared the passage would be construed as "too pretentious". The first two lines of the outro, however, are sung within the lyrics of "Why Don't We Live Together?" from the Please album. The original single version of "Opportunities" was unavailable on compact disc until the 1998 U.S.-only Essential compilation album, and was subsequently published on compact disc in the U.K., in a longer edit of the mix, on the 2-disc expanded 2001 remaster of Please.

Release
12-inch remixes for the 1985 release were produced by Ron Dean Miller of Nuance, while those for the 1986 release were produced by noted 1980s producer Shep Pettibone. Some of Miller's overdubs went on to be incorporated into the 1986 single version.

"In the Night"
The B-side of the 1985 release, "In the Night", is about the subculture known as the Zazous, which appeared in France during the German occupation of France in World War II; concerned with fashion and music, and allied with neither the Nazis and Vichy France nor the French Resistance, they were distrusted by both sides. Tennant, having read about the movement in a book by David Pryce-Jones, asks, in the song, the question of whether this apathy essentially amounted to collaborationism.

The Arther Baker remix from Disco became the opening theme music of the BBC fashion programme The Clothes Show from the second season in 1987 (the original 1986 theme was Five Star's "Find the Time (Shep Pettibone Remix)"). This continued for a decade until 1995 saw a fully instrumental re-recording of the song, "In the Night '95", for the purpose of replacing the old theme.

Music videos

First version 
The music video for the first single release was directed by Eric Watson and Andy Morahan. A Cadillac stands in an underground parking garage, the headlights switching on by themselves as Lowe walks away from it. The cover of a ground-level service hatch in front of the car vanishes, leaving a rectangular hole in which Tennant materialises, standing with only his head and shoulders visible. He is dressed in a hat, eyeglasses, and a suit by British fashion designer Stephen Linard. As he sings amid occasional washes of steam from the car, his face begins to jitter and his neck inflates in similar fashion to a frog. Lowe appears at intervals, wearing blue jeans and a leather jacket and standing/walking around the garage. At the end of the video, Tennant's body disintegrates to dust within his suit, leaving it upright on a coat hanger and his hat on the pavement. The suit disappears as Lowe drives away in the car.

Watson was partly inspired by the images of preachers in Wise Blood, the film adaptation of the Flannery O'Connor novel of the same title, in designing Tennant's appearance.

Second version 
For the re-release, Polish director Zbigniew Rybczyński was recruited. Tennant wears a suit and white gloves, while Lowe is dressed as a manual labourer in a dirty shirt, red baseball cap, and jeans with a pair of work gloves stuffed in the back pocket. A background of city skylines and clouds, rendered as neon outlines, scrolls past as Tennant sings. Duplicates of him and Lowe appear repeatedly, passing objects back and forth that represent their characters' respective statuses, such as a brick, sledgehammer, briefcase, stack of books, and top hat.

In popular culture
The song was the opening theme for the American reality television series Beauty and the Geek which premiered in 2005, running for 5 seasons.

The song was used in a commercial for Allstate in 2021 that aired during Super Bowl LV. In the weeks following the Super Bowl, the ad was in heavy rotation and triggered a wave of renewed interest in the Pet Shop Boys. The song re-entered the US charts after 35 years on Billboard'''s Dance/Electronic Digital Song Sales chart at No. 5, and by the last week of February it had surged to No. 1. The song stayed atop that chart for four straight weeks, totaling six consecutive weeks in the top five. The song climbed back to No. 1 on the chart for the week of April 17, 2021. It also reached No. 12 on the Billboard Dance/Electronic Songs chart and No. 25 on the Billboard Digital Songs chart. The surge in interest also affected other Pet Shop Boys songs with "West End Girls" vaulting to No. 6 on the Dance/Electronic Digital Songs chart.

 Other credits 
 2007, Psych episode "Black and Tan: A Crime of Fashion" (Season 2, Episode 15).
 2013, Raising Hope, S4 E2 - Burt Bucks
 2015, Fresh Off the Boat, S1 E13 - So Chineez
 2018, The Marvelous Mrs. Maisel'', S2 E7 - Look, She Made a Hat
 2022, ‘’WeCrashed’’, S1 E7 - The Power of We

Track listings

7" (UK) (1985 release) (Parlophone R6097)
 A. "Opportunities (Let's Make Lots of Money)" – 3:45
 B. "In the Night" – 4:50

12" #1 (UK) (1985 release) (Parlophone 12R6097)
 A. "Opportunities (Let's Make Lots of Money)" (Dance Mix) – 6:44
 B. "In the Night" – 4:50

12" #2 (UK) (1985 release) (Parlophone 12RA6097)
 A. "Opportunities (Let's Make Lots of Money)" (Version Latina) – 5:29
 B1. "Opportunities" (Dub for Money) – 4:54
 B2. "In the Night" – 4:50

7" (UK) (1986 release) (Parlophone R6129)
 A. "Opportunities (Let's Make Lots of Money)" – 3:36
 B. "Was That What It Was?" – 5:18

12" (UK) (1986 release) Parlophone (12R6129)
 A1. "Opportunities (Let's Make Lots of Money)" (Shep Pettibone Mastermix) – 7:18
 A2. "Opportunities" (Reprise) – 4:27
 B1. "Opportunities" (Original Dance Mix) – 6:45
 B2. "Was That What It Was?" – 5:18

Charts

Weekly charts

Year-end charts

References

External links
 

1985 songs
1985 singles
1986 singles
Music videos directed by Andy Morahan
Music videos directed by Zbigniew Rybczyński
Parlophone singles
Pet Shop Boys songs
Song recordings produced by Stephen Hague
Songs written by Chris Lowe
Songs written by Neil Tennant